Yekaterina  Smirnova (née Lukicheva) (born May 21, 1988) is a Kazakhstani slalom canoeist who has competed at the international level since 2004.

Smirnova competed in three Olympic Games. She was eliminated in the semifinals of the K1  event at the 2008 Summer Olympics in Beijing, finishing in 12th place. She then finished in 19th place in the K1 event at the 2016 Summer Olympics in Rio de Janeiro after being eliminated in the heats. At the delayed 2020 Summer Olympics in Tokyo, she finished 25th in the K1 event, once again eliminated in the heats.

References

External links

1988 births
People from East Kazakhstan Region
Canoeists at the 2008 Summer Olympics
Canoeists at the 2016 Summer Olympics
Kazakhstani female canoeists
Living people
Olympic canoeists of Kazakhstan
Canoeists at the 2010 Asian Games
Asian Games competitors for Kazakhstan
Canoeists at the 2020 Summer Olympics
21st-century Kazakhstani women